Spurt is a trade name used by Arriva Netherlands for most of the Stadler GTW trains operated in that country. The current Arriva fleet includes both 2-car (GTW 2/6) and 3-car (GTW 2/8) variants and both Electric and Diesel powered examples.  Eight of the units are equipped for operation through to Leer in Germany.

Accidents and incidents

One person was killed and six were injured.
Eighteen people were injured, three seriously.

Models 
A model of the Arriva Spurt liveried GTW 2/6 (Diesel Version) in HO Scale (1:87) has recently (Dec 2011) been produced by German model manufacturer PIKO as model no 59526 (DC 2-rail version) and no 59326 (AC 3-rail version).

References

External links 
 

Diesel multiple units of the Netherlands
Electric multiple units of the Netherlands